The 2022–23 UNC Greensboro Spartans men's basketball team represents the University of North Carolina at Greensboro during the 2022–23 NCAA Division I men's basketball season. The Spartans, led by second-year head coach Mike Jones, play their home games at the Greensboro Coliseum and Fleming Gymnasium in Greensboro, North Carolina as members of the Southern Conference (SoCon).

Previous season 
The Spartans finished the 2021–22 NCAA Division I men's basketball season season with a record of 17–14, 9–9 in SoCon play to finish in a tie for fifth place. As the No. 6 seed in the SoCon tournament, they lost to Samford in the quarterfinals. Guard De'Monte Buckingham was named to the Southern Conference Sports Media Association third team. They accepted an invitation to play in the 2022 College Basketball Invitational tournament where, as a No. 7 seed, they lost to No. 10-seeded Boston University in the first round.

Offseason

Departing players

Incoming transfers

2022 recruiting class

Roster

Schedule and results 

|-
!colspan=9 style=| Non-conference regular season 

|-

|-

|-

|-

|-

|-

|-

|-

|-

|-

|-

|-

|-
!colspan=12 style=|<span style=>SoCon Regular Season

|-

|-

|-

|-

|-

|-

|-

|-

|-

|-

|-

|-

|-

|-

|-

|-

|-

|-
!colspan=9 style=| SoCon tournament

|-

Source

Awards and honors

Southern Conference honors

SoCon Coaches Coach of the Year
 Mike Jones

SoCon Coaches Defensive Player of the Year
 Kobe Langley

SoCon Coaches First Team
 Keyshaun Langley

SoCon Coaches Third Team
 Keondre Kennedy

SoCon Sports Media Association First Team
Keyshaun Langley

NABC All-District First Team
Keyshaun Langley

References 

UNC Greensboro Spartans men's basketball seasons
UNC Greensboro
UNC Greensboro Spartans men's basketball
UNC Greensboro Spartans men's basketball